Fernando Jesús Ledesma (born 3 January 1992) is an Argentine footballer.

Career
Ledesma was born in Monte Buey, Argentina and he started his career with his local club San Martin de Monte Buey before moving to Newell's Old Boys. He joined Chilean second-tier club San Luis de Quillota in 2012, and made his debut as a second-half substitute in a 2–2 draw with San Marcos de Arica on 28 April 2012.

Career statistics
.

References

External links
 Fernando Ledesma at playmakerstats.com (English version of ceroacero.es)

1992 births
Living people
Sportspeople from Córdoba Province, Argentina
Argentine footballers
Argentine expatriate footballers
Newell's Old Boys footballers
San Luis de Quillota footballers
Expatriate footballers in Chile
Primera B de Chile players
Association football central defenders